Jerome John Mrazek (born October 15, 1951) is a Canadian former professional ice hockey goaltender who played in one NHL game for the Philadelphia Flyers during the 1975–76 NHL season. He played for three seasons with the University of Minnesota-Duluth.  He also played in the IHL and AHL.

See also
List of players who played only one game in the NHL

References

External links
 
Flyers History Profile

1951 births
Living people
Canadian ice hockey goaltenders
Des Moines Capitols players
Hershey Bears players
Sportspeople from Prince Albert, Saskatchewan
Maine Mariners players
Minnesota Duluth Bulldogs men's ice hockey players
Philadelphia Flyers draft picks
Philadelphia Flyers players
Richmond Robins players
Springfield Indians players
Ice hockey people from Saskatchewan